Cheap Cheap Cheap was a British television game show produced by Hat Trick Productions for Channel 4, presented and created by Noel Edmonds. Billed as "a game show that thinks it's a sitcom", the show takes place in a fictional general store and centres on a game show, hosted by the store owner (Edmonds). He is joined by the shop's eccentric staff, played by actors who appear throughout the game.

Edmonds conceived the idea and showed it to the Hat Trick Productions managing director Jimmy Mulville. The pair agreed to develop the premise and filmed the show's pilot episode after the production company constructed a studio inside a recreation area in Somerset. The television channel Channel 4 viewed the pilot and ordered a series of thirty episodes to be filmed.

Pairs of contestants are invited up to win an increasing amount of money by correctly picking the cheapest of three similar items, taken from the shop's stock. If they fail to guess the cheapest item they are eliminated from the game and lose all their money. The maximum amount of winnable money was £25,000.

References

External links 
 
 
 Cheap Cheap Cheap at hattrick.co.uk

2017 British television series debuts
2017 British television series endings
Channel 4 game shows
English-language television shows
Television series by Hat Trick Productions
Television shows set in Somerset